A number of motor vessels have been named Brendonia, including:

, a British coaster in service 1937–39
, a British coaster in service 1945–64

Ship names